James Sant  (1820–1916) was a British painter specialising in portraits and known particularly for images of women and children and artistic exploration of the symbolism of childhood. He was a member of the Royal Academy. George Sant and Sarah Sant were also artists and are believed to have been his brother and sister.

Biography 
Sant was born in Croydon, Surrey, England, on 23 April 1820. He was taught first by the watercolourist John Varley, then by Augustus Wall Callcott, then from the age of twenty was taught by the Royal Academy Schools.

He lived to the age of 96 and exhibited at the Grosvenor Gallery as well as producing nearly three hundred canvases for exhibition at the Academy. The first of these, a portrait of his father William Sant, was exhibited in 1840; the last was exhibited in 1915. In 1851 he married Elizabeth (Eliza) Thomson, daughter of Dr R.M.M. Thomson, a surgeon and member of the Agri Horticultural Society of India. His 1853 picture of the infant Samuel was his first popular success, and engravings of this and of Little Red Riding Hood and The Soul's Awakening sold in great numbers.

In 1861, his portraits of friends and relatives of Frances, Lady Waldegrave were exhibited by Ernest Gambart at his Gallery in Pall Mall. This enhanced his reputation and he was elected ARA, and later RA; in 1871 he was appointed Principal Painter in Ordinary (official portraitist) to Queen Victoria, having become known for his portraits of the royal children and in particular his 1870 portrait of Prince Leopold and Princess Beatrice.  He was the last artist to hold the title.

Sant is best known for his portraits, particularly of women and of children; he was "the emperor of children," in the words of the Athenaeum. Nevertheless, many of his pictures were landscapes and particularly gardens; he also painted seascapes, landscapes with animals, and other subjects including the Wish Tower, a Martello Tower at Eastbourne. His later pictures are freer in style; some have been favourably compared with the work of the French Impressionists and some have a visionary or mannerist quality; his landscapes could include figures with blank or distorted features or simple silhouettes such as the nun in Convent Walls (1910). He continued painting into old age; All My Fancy! (1910), an Italian landscape with villa and hills, he painted in bed from memory.

He became a Commander of the Royal Victorian Order (CVO) in 1914 and resigned from the RA in the same year to "make room for younger men."  He died in Lancaster Gate, London, on 12 July 1916. His work can be found at the Tate Gallery and at the National Portrait Gallery.

His sister Sarah Sherwood Clarke was also an accomplished artist: but all that is presently known of her work is a collection of 48 different views of Scotland from 1854; these were exhibited for the first time at the "Watercolours & Works on Paper Fair" in London in February 2010. She married Frederick Clarke, Superintendent and later Secretary of the London and South Western Railway.

His brother George Sant RBA (Royal Society of British Artists)(1821–1877) was a landscape painter and the two brothers occasionally collaborated on paintings. Both James and George Sant were among the notable artist acquaintances of Charles Dodgson (Lewis Carroll); James Sant, his daughter Sarah Fanny and son Jemmy were the subjects of photographic studies by Dodgson.

At auction, Sant's work can achieve hundreds of pounds sterling or hundreds of thousands of pounds depending on size, quality and subject matter. Allegorical subjects remain popular; Courage, Anxiety and Despair: Watching the Battle (circa 1850) achieved £61,250 in 2012 and Astronomy almost twice this in 2008. His The Schoolmaster's Daughter (1871) and Miss Martineau's Garden (1873) are illustrated in Victorian Painters by Jeremy Maas; The Seventh Earl of Cardigan Relating the Story of the Cavalry Charge of Balaclava...(1854) is illustrated in the same volume and in Victorian Painters by Christopher Wood. Sant's work can be seen at Southside House, Wimbledon, and at
the National Portrait Gallery. Many of his works were reproduced as prints during his lifetime; his Courage has since been reproduced as a greetings-card and his Hilda Pennington-Mellor, aged three (1880) as a post-card.

Gallery

Legacy and offices

Sources 
 Biography with photo 
 Obituary
 Acquaintance with Lewis Carroll
 James Sant's son photographed by Lewis Carroll

References

External links 

 
 

1820 births
1916 deaths
19th-century English painters
English male painters
20th-century English painters
English portrait painters
Principal Painters in Ordinary
Commanders of the Royal Victorian Order
Royal Academicians
People from Croydon
20th-century English male artists
19th-century English male artists